The 2007 Nigerian Senate election in Edo State was held on April 21, 2007, to elect members of the Nigerian Senate to represent Edo State. Odion Ugbesia representing Edo Central, Yisa Braimoh representing Edo North and Ehigie Edobor Uzamere representing Edo South all won on the platform of the Peoples Democratic Party.

Overview

Summary

Results

Edo Central 
The election was won by Odion Ugbesia of the Peoples Democratic Party.

Edo North 
The election was won by Yisa Braimoh of the Peoples Democratic Party.

Edo South 
The election was won by Ehigie Edobor Uzamere of the Peoples Democratic Party.

References 

April 2007 events in Nigeria
Edo State Senate elections
Edo